Lin Shen ( October 1908 – 28 October 1992), also known as Mu En, was a Taiwanese politician. She was one of the first group of women elected to the Legislative Yuan in 1948.

Biography
Born in Taipei County, Lin attended Hwa Nan College in Fuzhou, graduating in 1930. She then studied biology at Yenching University, before transferring to the Department of Sociology at Xiamen University, where she earned a BA. She subsequently attended the research institute of Columbia University. She worked in Shanghai and Nanjing, where she became secretary of the Young Women's Christian Association in both cities. In Shanghai she also served as chair of the Shanghai Taiwan Women's Association. Returning to Taiwan in 1946, she became research director of the Women's Campaign Committee. She chaired the Chinese Women's Anti-Communist Federation and the Taiwan Association for the Advancement of Social Undertakings, and was a committee member of the local Red Cross society.

A member of the Kuomintang, she contested the 1948 elections to the Legislative Yuan. Taiwan had eight seats and she finished seventh in the overall vote count. However, the electoral law reserved one of the eight seats for a woman, with votes for female candidates counted separately. As another female candidate Hsieh Er had received more votes than Li, the electoral authorities declared Hsieh elected and gave the other seven seats to the top seven male candidates. Lin took the matter to court, which ruled in her favour and she was declared elected. She remained a member of parliament until the 87th session in 1991.

She died in October 1992.

References

1908 births
Yenching University alumni
Xiamen University alumni
Kuomintang Members of the Legislative Yuan in Taiwan
20th-century Chinese women politicians
20th-century Taiwanese women politicians
Members of the 1st Legislative Yuan
Members of the 1st Legislative Yuan in Taiwan
1992 deaths